Estádio José Alvalade is a football stadium in Lisbon, Portugal, home of Sporting Clube de Portugal. It was built adjacent to the site of the older stadium. The stadium is named after José Alvalade (1885–1918), the founder and first club member of Sporting CP in the early twentieth century.

Origin 
The previous José Alvalade Stadium was opened on 10 June 1956. Plans by Sporting CP to modernize the club in the late 1990s coincided with the decision to award Portugal the right to host UEFA Euro 2004, and the decision was made to build a new stadium, with construction beginning on 15 January 2001. The club's statutes dictated that the stadium would be called Estádio José Alvalade. It would be the club's seventh stadium.

History
The stadium is the center of a complex called Alvalade XXI, designed by Portuguese architect Gil Dias, which includes a mall called Alvaláxia with a 12-screen movie theater, a health club, the club's museum, a sports pavilion, a clinic, and an office building. The complex cost a total of €162 million, with the stadium accounting with almost €120 million. On the exterior, the stadium features multi-coloured tiles. Originally the seats were arranged in a random-looking mosaic of mixed colours, however during its second decade of use these were all gradually changed to dark green, with the roof support towers and access stairways, initially bright yellow, also repainted green.

It was classified by UEFA as a 4-star stadium, enabling it to host finals of major UEFA events. The stadium – originally projected to hold only 40,000 spectators at any given time – has a capacity of 50,095 and was acoustically engineered as a venue for major concerts.  The stadium has also a total of 1,315 underground parking spaces, including 30 for disabled spectators.

The new stadium official opening was on 6 August 2003 when Sporting played and beat Manchester United 3–1. The stadium hosted five matches of UEFA Euro 2004, one of them being the semi-final between Portugal and the Netherlands, which Portugal won 2–1. In May 2005, the stadium was upgraded to 5-star stadium status by UEFA, the same month it hosted the 2005 UEFA Cup Final between Sporting and CSKA Moscow, which CSKA Moscow won 3–1.

After years of coping with a poor playing surface, the Sporting board initially decided to install synthetic turf for the 2011–12 season, but this decision was later abandoned for the use of artificial lighting.

It hosted quarter-finals and semi-finals matches during the 2019–20 UEFA Champions League.

Notable matches

First match

UEFA Euro 2004

2005 UEFA Cup Final

Other international matches

Seating distribution
 Disabled Seats – 50
 Skybox Seats – 1,542
 VIP and Business Seats – 1,968
 Tribune Seats – 100
 Public Seats (Level A) – 24,261
 Public Seats (Level B) – 21,970
 Press Seats – 204

Transport
The Stadium is served by the Campo Grande station of the Lisbon Metro and a bus terminal served by several companies. The Segunda Circular, a major ring road of Lisbon, runs close by and the stadium can be reached via the exit Estádio de Alvalade. There are several car parks around the stadium.

It is a relatively short distance (3 km) from Lisbon's biggest stadium, the Estádio da Luz, homeground of rivals S.L. Benfica.

References

External links

Sporting Club web site

Jose Alvalade
Sporting CP
UEFA Euro 2004 stadiums
Sports venues in Lisbon
Sports venues completed in 2003